Ottakring  is a station on  of the Vienna U-Bahn. Beside the U-Bahn station is the Wien Ottakring railway station, which is served by line S45 of the Vienna S-Bahn.

Both stations are located in the Ottakring District. The U-Bahn station opened in 1998.

References

Buildings and structures in Ottakring
Railway stations opened in 1998
1998 establishments in Austria
Vienna U-Bahn stations
Railway stations in Austria opened in the 20th century